Berks, Bucks and Oxon Division 3 is an English rugby union league featuring teams from Berkshire, Buckinghamshire and Oxfordshire. As with all of the divisions in this area at this level, the entire league is made up of second, third and fourth teams of clubs whose first teams play at a higher level of the rugby union pyramid.  Promoted teams move up to Berks/Bucks & Oxon 2 while relegated teams drop to Berks/Bucks & Oxon 4 - north or south - depending on location.

The league was introduced in 2011 originally as a single division, splitting into regional divisions for the 2012 and 2013 seasons, before returning to the original format.

Participating Clubs 2016-17
Bicester II
Bracknell III
Buckingham III
Grove II
Maidenhead III
Reading III
Reading Abbey III
Tadley II
Wallingford II

Berks/Bucks & Oxon 3 Honours

See also
 Berkshire RFU
 Buckinghamshire RFU
 Oxfordshire RFU
 English rugby union system
 Rugby union in England

References

Rugby union leagues in the English Midlands
Rugby union in Buckinghamshire
Rugby union in Oxfordshire
Rugby union in Berkshire